Malaya Balzuga (Bäläkäy Bälzügä) is a rural locality (a village) in Novotatyshlinsky Selsoviet, Tatyshlinsky District, Bashkortostan, Russia. The population was 246 as of 2010. There are 2 streets.

Geography 
Malaya Balzuga is located 15 km southeast of Verkhniye Tatyshly (the district's administrative centre) by road. Bigineyevo is the nearest rural locality.

References 

Rural localities in Tatyshlinsky District